Philip John Basey (born 27 August 1948) is a Welsh retired professional footballer who played as a left winger in the Football League for Brentford. After his release in 1967, he played for over a decade in non-League football and notably scored over 100 career goals for Southern League club Crawley Town.

Playing career 
Basey began his career in the youth team at Fourth Division club Brentford, after writing to the club requesting a trial. He progressed to sign a professional contract in July 1966. At age 18, he made his professional debut in a league match versus Tranmere Rovers on 24 September 1966 and played the full 90 minutes of the 1–1 draw. His second and final appearance for the club came three days later, in a 2–2 draw with Lincoln City. After his release at the end of the 1966–67 season, Basey dropped into non-League football and played for Gloucester City, Crawley Town, Maidstone United, Hillingdon Borough, Tooting & Mitcham United and Bromley.

Career statistics

Honours 
Crawley Town

 Southern League First Division fourth-place promotion: 1968–69

Maidstone United

 Southern League First Division South: 1972–73

References

1948 births
Living people
Footballers from Cardiff
Brentford F.C. players
English Football League players
Gloucester City A.F.C. players
Crawley Town F.C. players
Maidstone United F.C. (1897) players
Hillingdon Borough F.C. players
Tooting & Mitcham United F.C. players
Bromley F.C. players
Southern Football League players
Isthmian League players
Association football wingers
Welsh footballers